is a private junior college in Okazaki, Aichi, Japan.

History 
It was established in 1986. Distance course was established in 1994.

Academic departments
 International communication

See also 
 List of junior colleges in Japan
 Aichi Sangyo University

External links

References

Japanese junior colleges
Universities and colleges in Aichi Prefecture